White Coat, Black Art is a Canadian radio documentary series on CBC Radio One, hosted by physician Brian Goldman that examines the business and culture of medicine from an insider's perspective. Its name is a reference to the white coats that doctors wear, and to the ways that practicing medicine is still in some ways a "black art" rather than a science: mysterious, intuitive, and difficult to master.

The series began as a summer series in 2007 and became a regular program on the network's schedule.

The Canadian Medical Association awarded the program the 2011 Media Award for Health Reporting (Excellence in Radio Reporting / In-Depth).

References

External links

CBC Radio One programs
Canadian documentary radio programs
Radio series about health care